Vera Sybil Thomas (née Dace; 3 December 1921 – 9 July 1995) was an English international table tennis and tennis player.

Table tennis career
She won seven medals at the World Table Tennis Championships including three gold medals; two in the team events and one as a member of the winning doubles team in the 1948 World Table Tennis Championships with Peggy Franks. She also won three English Open titles.

Tennis career
As a tennis player she competed in 15 editions of the Wimbledon Championships between 1946 and 1961. Her best result in the singles was reaching the fourth round in 1948 in which she lost to Nelly Landry.

Personal life
She married Arthur Thomas in 1947 and became Vera Thomas-Dace.

See also
 List of table tennis players
 List of World Table Tennis Championships medalists
 List of England players at the World Team Table Tennis Championships

References

English female table tennis players
British female tennis players
1921 births
1995 deaths
English female tennis players
Place of birth missing